Carin Swensson (28 February 1905 – 14 October 1990) was a Swedish actress. She appeared in more than 50 films between 1933 and 1963.

Selected filmography

 Boman's Boy (1933)
 Under False Flag (1935)
 Ocean Breakers (1935)
 The Lady Becomes a Maid (1936)
 Unfriendly Relations (1936)
 Just a Bugler (1938)
 Mot nya tider (1939)
 Wanted (1939)
 The Crazy Family (1940)
 The Bjorck Family (1940)
 Sunny Sunberg (1941)
 How to Tame a Real Man (1941)
 Jolanta the Elusive Pig (1945)
 His Majesty Must Wait (1945)
 The Girls in Smaland (1945)
 Motherhood (1945)
 Brita in the Merchant's House (1946)
 Song of Stockholm (1947)
 Dynamite (1947)
 Each Heart Has Its Own Story (1948)
 Carnival Evening (1948)
 Bohus Battalion (1949)
 Andersson's Kalle (1950)
 My Sister and I (1950)
 The Girl from Backafall (1953)

References

External links

1905 births
1990 deaths
Swedish film actresses
People from Gothenburg